Rita Deneve (December 6, 1944, Liedekerke - January 21, 2018, Mechelen) was a Belgian singer. She had a #1 hit in Flanders in 1971 with the song "The Very First Time", and competed several times to be the Belgian entrant in the Eurovision Song Contest.

Belgian women singers
1944 births
2018 deaths